George Thuo (14 February 1967 – 17 November 2013) was a Kenyan politician. He belonged to the Party of National Unity. In the 2007 Kenyan parliamentary election he was elected to the National Assembly of Kenya to represent the Juja Constituency.

He was the Chief Whip of the ruling PNU party in Parliament.

In April 2010 he lost the parliamentary seat after a court nullified the 2007 election results of Juja Constituency citing irregularities 

A by-election was subsequently held on 20 September 2010, but Thuo was left third after William Kabogo Gitau (NARC-Kenya) and  Alice Wambui of Kenya National Congress.

Previously, George Thuo (GT) worked as an Accountant and later Managing Director of Kenya Bus Services. He left KBS to start his own Nairobi city metro transport company, City Hopper Ltd, which was a 100% family owned business. In the meantime, he was Managing Director of Trendsetters tyre company, a position he left to join politics in 2007.

GT who was an outgoing, loud speaking, direct, open minded and regarded as having a larger than life personality, left behind his wife Judy Thuo and three children, a son and two daughters.

Death
He died on 17 November 2013 at Porkies Pub in Thika town, Kiambu county, Kenya. According to several news sources, he collapsed while having drinks with friends.

References

External links
Hon. George Thuo Official Website
Hon. George Thuo Online Memorial

1967 births
2013 deaths
Party of National Unity (Kenya) politicians
Members of the National Assembly (Kenya)